Ingemar Henry Lundquist (October 19, 1921 – February 25, 2007) was a prolific inventor and mechanical engineer.

Early life and education 
Lundquist graduated from the Stockholm Institute of Technology in 1945 with a mechanical engineering degree. He migrated to the United States in 1948 and became an American citizen in 1950.

Career  

He worked for various medical technology companies in the San Francisco Bay Area, including Advanced Cardiovascular Systems and E.P.Technologies.

Patents 

Lundquist had hundreds of inventions, typically working in his garage or basement. He held more than a hundred patents. His inventions included over-the-wire balloon angioplasty, T.U.N.A., and somnoplasty. He also worked on cardiac stem-cell therapy.

References

External links 

 Database of patents for Ingemar Lundquist

1921 births
2007 deaths
Burials at Mountain View Cemetery (Oakland, California)
People from Carmel Valley Village, California
American mechanical engineers
People from Oakland, California
Swedish emigrants to the United States
Engineers from California
20th-century American engineers
20th-century Swedish inventors